The Roman Catholic Diocese of Guntur, Andhra Pradesh, India was created out of the Diocese of Nellore, 1940. Msgr Thomas Pothacamury was its First Bishop.

The present bishop of the diocese is the Most Rev. Bhagaiah Chinnabathini.

The cathedral of the Diocese is in Phirangipuram.

Bishops of Guntur
The Most Rev. Thomas Pothacamury (Pothakamuri) (9 April 1940 – 15 October 1942
The Most Rev. Ignatius Mummadi (13 July 1943 – 26 November 1973)
The Most Rev. Balashoury Thanugundla (26 November 1973 – 25 September 1974)
The Most Rev. Mariadas Kagithapu M.S.F.S. (19 December 1974 – 10 September 1982)
The Most Rev. Bishop Gali Bali (2 July 1984 Appointed - June 2016)
The Most Rev. Bishop Bhagaiah Chinnabathini (25 June 2016 appointed Bishop)

Parishes in Guntur Diocese
A few of the parishes with thousands of the faithful followers of the Roman Catholic religion in Guntur Diocese:
Angalakuduru
Attalur
Kanaparyu
Kuchipudi
Mutluru
Patibandla: 
Phirangipuram: A village consists of most number of Roman Catholics.
Ravipadu
Rentachintala
Reddipalem
Repalle
Siripuram
Tenali 
Thallacheruvu: 90% of the village consists of Roman Catholics.
Thubadu
Vijayapuri south
Thurakapalem100% catholics in the village and all of them belong to Gandikota Kamma community.
Velangini Nagar 90% of the residents of Velangini Nagar are Roman Catholics only.

Saints and causes for canonisation
 Servant of God Sr. Dr. Mary Glowrey, JMJ

References

External links
Information on Diocese of Guntur
Information on Diocese of Gunture at Catholic Hierarchy

Guntur
Christian organizations established in 1940
Roman Catholic dioceses and prelatures established in the 20th century
Christianity in Andhra Pradesh
1940 establishments in India